Harrison 'Harry' William Powell (born 1 June 1995) is a Welsh former first-class cricketer.

Powell was born at Monmouth in June 1995. He was educated at St Joseph's Roman Catholic High School, before going up to Cardiff University. While studying at Cardiff, he made two appearances in first-class cricket for Cardiff MCCU in 2014 against Glamorgan and Gloucestershire. Playing as a right-arm fast-medium bowler, he took just one wicket in his two matches. In addition to playing first-class cricket, Powell also played minor counties cricket for Wales Minor Counties from 2011–16. Powell is now a serving Police Officer who is mentored by PC Ben Jones

References

External links

1995 births
Living people
Sportspeople from Monmouth, Wales
Cricketers from Monmouthshire
Alumni of Cardiff University
Welsh cricketers
Wales National County cricketers
Cardiff MCCU cricketers